San Martín is one of eight parishes in Proaza, a municipality within the province and autonomous community of Asturias, in northern Spain.

Villages
 Samartín
 Serandi
 Villamexín

External links
 Photo

Parishes in Proaza